Seener is a rural locality (a village) in Alikovsky District of the Chuvash Republic, Russia, located near the district's administrative center of Alikovo and near the Cheboksary–Alikovo–Krasnye Chetai and Cheboksary–Alikovo–Yadrin auto routes.  The population is 135, mostly Chuvash females; it was 248, 224 and 156 in 1926, 1907 and 1859, respectively.

Two small rivers — the Abashyrma and Khelkassy — flow in the vicinity of the village.  The village only has one street (Kooperativnaya).

The climate is moderately continental, with long cold winters and warm summers.

Etymology and history
Until 1927, Siner was a part of Alikovskaya Volost of Yadrinsky Uyezd. On November 1, 1927, the village became a part of Alikovsky District. It was transferred to Vurnarsky District on December 20, 1962, but was returned to Alikovsky District on March 14, 1965.

Notable people
Zolotov's dynasty

Further reading
L. I. Yefimov, "Alikovsky District" (""), Alikovo, 1994.
"Аликовская энциклопедия", (Encyklopaedia of Alikovo) editors: Efimov L.A., Efimov E.L., Ananjev A. A., Terentjev G. K., Cheboksary, 2009, .

References

Rural localities in Chuvashia
Alikovsky District
Yadrinsky Uyezd